Lasiopsis is a Holarctic genus of scarab beetles in the tribe Melolonthini.

Species
Lasiopsis balgensis Murayama, 1941
Lasiopsis canina (Zoubkov, 1829)
Lasiopsis duchoni Reitter, 1902
Lasiopsis golovjankoi Medvedev, 1951
Lasiopsis koltzei Reitter, 1900
Lasiopsis kozlovi Medvedev, 1951
Lasiopsis kryzhanovskii Nikolajev & Kabakov, 1980
Lasiopsis manchuricus Murayama, 1941
Lasiopsis sahlbergi (Mannerheim, 1849)

References

Melolonthinae
Scarabaeidae genera